Scharsterbrug  is a village in De Fryske Marren in the province of Friesland, the Netherlands. It had a population of around 830 in 2017.

There is a restored windmill, De Skarrenmolen.

History
The village was first mentioned in 1847 as Scharsterbrug, and the means bridge over the canal running through the Scharren (communal ground). In 1580, the Scharsterrijn was dug for peat excavation in the Scharren. In 1840, it was home to 147 people. In 1911, a dairy factory was constructed and in 1914, a church was built. The Skarrenmoune is a polder mill which was probably built in 1881.

Before 2014, Scharsterbrug was part of the Skarsterlân municipality and before 1984 it was part of Doniawerstal.

Gallery

References

External links

De Fryske Marren
Populated places in Friesland